is a Japanese community FM radio station in Hatsukaichi, Hiroshima.

Overview
The station received its broadcasting license on January 1, 2008, and went on the air on February 23, 2008 as the 16th community FM station in the Chūgoku region.

The radio broadcast can be received in Hatsukaichi, Otake, Etajima, Kaita, Saka and western areas of Kure.

Hours
Its broadcast hours are from 7 a.m. to 10 p.m. (24 hours a day if a disaster occurs in the area).

Community card
The station offered community card "Club FM Hatsukaichi" for listeners to use local shops and get information of their events.

Magazine
The station also publish local magazine "Club FM Hatsukaichu Radio magazine".

External links
 Official website 

Mass media in Hatsukaichi, Hiroshima
Radio in Japan
Companies based in Hiroshima Prefecture
Radio stations established in 2008